Straight Blast Gym Ireland (also known as SBG Ireland) is a mixed martial arts academy and professional team based in Dublin, Ireland. It is run by John Kavanagh, and is part of Straight Blast Gym International. The team has produced several Ultimate Fighting Championship (UFC) fighters, the most notable being Conor McGregor.

History
The gym was founded in 2001 by John Kavanagh, who was a black belt in karate. Later that year it became part of Matt Thornton's Straight Blast Gym International (SBGi), a worldwide association of over 35 gyms, after Kavanagh met Thornton at a tournament in Africa. After partnering with SBGi, Thornton awarded Kavanagh his Brazilian Jiu-Jitsu (BJJ) purple belt in 2002. Three years later, Kavanagh won gold at the 2005 European BJJ Championship. In 2007, he was awarded his BJJ black belt, making Kavanagh Ireland's first ever BJJ black belt in the process.

After 15 years at SBG Ireland, main striking coach Owen Roddy announced his departure in the end of November 2018.

Ultimate Fighting Championship
In 2009, Tom Egan became SBG's first ever fighter to compete in the UFC. Egan lost to John Hathaway at UFC 93: Franklin vs. Henderson in Dublin. It wasn't until 2012 that SBG returned to the UFC, when Gunnar Nelson made his debut against DaMarques Johnson at UFC on Fuel TV: Struve vs. Miocic, winning via first-round rear-naked choke. The following year, Conor McGregor made his debut in Sweden. He defeated Marcus Brimage with a first-round knockout, and marked the beginning of a new era of success for the team.

At UFC 189 on 11 July 2015, SBG won their first UFC belt. In the main event of the evening, Conor McGregor had been booked to face José Aldo for the UFC Featherweight title. Aldo pulled out of the fight due to a rib injury however, meaning McGregor instead faced Chad Mendes for the interim title. McGregor won the fight via second-round TKO, on a card that also featured a loss and a victory for SBG fighters Cathal Pendred and Gunnar Nelson respectively.

At UFC 194, an event which set numerous records, Conor McGregor finally got the chance to become the undisputed UFC Featherweight champion, and unify his belt against José Aldo who had been undefeated for over ten years. It took McGregor only 13 seconds to KO the Brazilian, making it the fastest ever finish in a UFC championship match.

The Ultimate Fighter
Following McGregor's interim title win at UFC 189, the UFC announced that he would be coaching against Urijah Faber in Season 22 of The Ultimate Fighter. In a "Europe vs USA" themed installment, McGregor was aided by his SBG coaches, Sergey Pikulskiy, Owen Roddy, Arkadiusz Sternalski and former SBG fighter Tom Egan who now coaches out of Peter Welch's Gym in Boston. Despite a slow start, Team Europe took six fighters into the quarter-finals, and then had three of the remaining four in the semi-finals. SBG's Artem Lobov was due to face England's Saul Rogers in an all-European Final, but visa issues saw Team USA's Ryan Hall replace Rogers in the season finale, where he utilized his superior grappling to great effect, and earned a unanimous decision victory over Lobov.

Fighters

World MMA Awards
SBG and its team members have received various recognitions from The World MMA Awards:

Gym / Personnel
 2014 Gym of the Year (nominated) 
 2015 Coach of the Year (nominated) 
 2015 Trainer of the Year (nominated) 
 2015 Gym of the Year (nominated) 
 2016 Gym of the Year (nominated) 
 2016 Coach of the Year (winner) 

Fighters
 2013 Breakthrough Fighter of the Year (nominated) 
 2013 International Fighter of the Year (nominated) 
 2014 Comeback of the Year (nominated) 
 2014 International Fighter of the Year (winner) 
 2015 Knockout of the Year (nominated) 
 2015 International Fighter of the Year (winner) 
 2015 Fighter of the Year (winner) 
 2016 Fighter of the Year (winner)

Gyms
While John Kavanagh's gym remains SBG Ireland's official headquarters, the association has added new branches with gyms across the country. The current gyms are as follows (see https://www.sbgireland.com/affiliate-sbg-gyms/):

 SBG Belfast
Joys Entry, Belfast, Antrim.
 SBG Cork City
North Point Business Park, Blackpool, Cork.

 SBG Ireland (HQ)
SBG Ireland HQ
Unit 13, Goldenbridge Industrial Estate
Inchicore
Dublin 8
D08 WK22
 SBG Clonmel
Cashel Road Industrial Estate, Clonmel, Tipperary
 SBG Killarney
Mangerton View, Killarney, Kerry

 SBG Ballina
Bunree Road, Bunree, Ballina, Mayo
 SBG Evolution
Kilcruttin Business Park, Tullamore, Offaly
 SBG Strabane
Riverside Leisure Centre, Strabane, Tyrone

See also
List of Top Professional MMA Training Camps

References

External links
 

2001 establishments in Ireland
Mixed martial arts training facilities
Mixed martial arts in Ireland
Sports clubs in the Republic of Ireland
Sports clubs in Dublin (city)
Sports clubs established in 2001